Samson Eitrem (28 December 1872 – 8 July 1966) was a Norwegian philologist, an expert in ancient literature, religion and magic.

Personal life
In 1910 he married Wilhelmina Galtung.

Career
Eitrem passed examen artium in 1890 at the Bergen Cathedral School, and started studying philology. He graduated from the University in Kristiania in 1896, and continued with further studies in Germany, Italy, Great Britain and Greece, graduating as Ph.D. in 1903. He was appointed professor in classical philology at the University of Oslo from 1914 to 1945. His scientific works include Opferritus und Voropfer der Griechen und Römer from 1915, Papyri Osloenses (three volumes, 1926–1936, in collaboration with Leiv Amundsen), and Some notes on the demonology in the New Testament from 1950. He was a co-founder (in 1924) of the scientific journal , along with Gunnar Rudberg. Eitrem was given honorary doctorates at the University of Athens and the Aristotle University of Thessaloniki. He died in Oslo in 1966.

He was elected a foreign member of the Royal Netherlands Academy of Arts and Sciences in 1946.

References

1872 births
1966 deaths
People from Kragerø
Classical philologists
Members of the Royal Netherlands Academy of Arts and Sciences
Norwegian philologists
University of Oslo alumni
Academic staff of the University of Oslo